Borek  is a village in the administrative district of Gmina Sulęczyno, within Kartuzy County, Pomeranian Voivodeship, in northern Poland.

For details of the history of the region, see History of Pomerania.

The village has a population of 140.

It was probably the birthplace in 1896 of Franziska Schanzkowska (Franciszka Szankowska; later Anna Anderson), who gained notoriety for claiming to be Grand Duchess Anastasia Nikolaevna of Russia.

References

Borek